The allocations for Steps 1 to 6 for season 2019–20 were announced by the FA on 19 May 2019. These are subject to appeal, and the United Counties' constitution is subject to ratification at the league's AGM on 22 June 2019.

As a result of the COVID-19 pandemic, this season's competition was formally abandoned on 26 March 2020, with all results from the season being expunged, and no promotion or relegation taking place to, from, or within the competition. On 30 March 2020, sixty-six non-league clubs sent an open letter to the Football Association requesting that they reconsider their decision.

Premier Division

The Premier Division featured 15 clubs which competed in the division last season, along with five new clubs.
Clubs, promoted from Division One:
Anstey Nomads
Lutterworth Town
Clubs, transferred from the Midland League:
Loughborough University
Quorn
Shepshed Dynamo

League table

Division One

Division One featured 17 clubs which competed in the division last season, along with three new clubs:
 Saffron Dynamo, promoted from the Leicestershire Senior League
 Wellingborough Whitworth, relegated from the Premier Division
 Whittlesey Athletic, promoted from the Peterborough & District League

League table

References

External links
United Counties League FA Full Time

9
United Counties League seasons
Association football events curtailed and voided due to the COVID-19 pandemic